The 1998 Canisius Golden Griffins football team represented Canisius College in the 1998 NCAA Division I-AA football season. The Golden Griffins offense scored 120 points while the defense allowed 284 points.

Schedule

References

Canisius
Canisius Golden Griffins football seasons
Canisius Golden Griffins football